Harrow was a constituency of the House of Commons of the UK Parliament 1885—1945 in Middlesex, a traditional county; it covered an area forming part of the north-west of today's Greater London.  It returned one Member of Parliament (MP).

The constituency was created for the 1885 general election, substantially reduced on the creation of more seats in 1918 and abolished for the 1945 general election.

The 2023 Periodic Review of Westminster constituencies initially proposed recreating the constituency, with boundaries similar to that of Harrow West.

Boundaries
1885–1918: The Parishes of Edgware, Great Stanmore, Harrow-on-the-Hill, Hendon, Kingsbury, Little Stanmore, Pinner, Twyford Abbey and Willesden (and the area in the Parliamentary Boroughs of Hampstead, Marylebone, Paddington and St Pancras; for many wealthy voters this sub-provision gave a choice of which seat to vote for).
1918–1945: The Urban Districts of Harrow on the Hill, Greenford, Wealdstone, and Wembley and part (the non-detached part) of Hanwell.

Members of Parliament

Election results

Elections in the 1880s

Elections in the 1890s 

Ambrose is appointed Attorney-General of the Duchy of Lancaster, requiring a by-election.

Ambrose resigned after being appointed as a Master in Lunacy, requiring a by-election.

Elections in the 1900s

Elections in the 1910s 

General Election 1914–15:

Another General Election was required to take place before the end of 1915. The political parties had been making preparations for an election to take place and by July 1914, the following candidates had been selected; 
Unionist: Harry Mallaby-Deeley
Liberal: H. E. A. Cotton

Chamberlayne was nominated by the non-party Harrow Electors League

Elections in the 1920s

Elections in the 1930s 

General Election 1939–40

Another General Election was required to take place before the end of 1940. The political parties had been making preparations for an election to take place and by the Autumn of 1939, the following candidates had been selected; 
Conservative: Isidore Salmon
Labour: Maurice S Davidson
British Union: Harry Frisby

Elections in the 1940s

References 

Parliamentary constituencies in London (historic)
Constituencies of the Parliament of the United Kingdom established in 1885
Constituencies of the Parliament of the United Kingdom disestablished in 1945